Institute for Politics and Society is a think-tank affiliated with ANO 2011. It was founded in October 2014.

History
The institute was founded in October 2014 by Andrej Babiš. Some politicians of ANO 2011 are involved with the think-tank. This includes Jaroslav Faltýnek, Adriana Krnáčová and Pavel Telička. In March 2015, Journalist Jan Macháček became the Chairman of the institute.

References

ANO 2011
Think tanks based in the Czech Republic
2014 establishments in the Czech Republic